The Toronto blackout may refer to:
 Northeast Blackout of 1965, which affected the entire city of Toronto
 Northeast Blackout of 2003, which affected the entire city of Toronto
 2009 Toronto blackout, which affected a huge swath of the city's southwest end from January 15–16, 2009.
 December 2013 North American storm complex, which affected most of the city of Toronto.